The Cadet Instructors Cadre (CIC) consists of approximately 7,500 Canadian Forces (CF) officers whose primary duty is the safety, supervision, administration and training of Royal Canadian Sea, Army, and Air Cadets. The branch is the largest single group within the Canadian Forces reserve force subcomponent Cadet Organizations Administration and Training Service (COATS) and is the largest officer branch in the Canadian Forces. The COATS subcomponent of the Reserve Force employs members from all branches and occupations of the Royal Canadian Navy, Canadian Army, and Royal Canadian Air Force of the Canadian Forces.

Cadets are youth 12 to 18 years of age, and participate in 1,150 Sea and Army Cadet Corps and Air Cadet Squadrons located across Canada.

According to Canadian Forces Chief of Review Services, about 45% of all CIC branch personnel have former Regular Force or Primary Reserve service. Some are former cadets who wish to continue their involvement in the Canadian Cadet Organizations: the Royal Canadian Sea Cadets, Royal Canadian Army Cadets, and  Royal Canadian Air Cadets. Others are recruited from the general population.

References

External links
 CIC training site
Canadian Forces Recruiting
Canadian Forces and Department of National Defence

Order of precedence

Canadian Armed Forces personnel branches
Cadet Instructors Cadre (Canada)